The Millstone Valley Agricultural District is a  historic district located south of Millstone on the western side of the Millstone River along River Road / County Route 533 in Hillsborough Township, Somerset County, New Jersey. The district was added to the National Register of Historic Places on August 10, 1977.

Contributing properties
The Blackwell's Mills Farmhouse was built in the first quarter of the 19th century. The two and one half story building shows Federal style.
 
The Brookie was built early to mid 19th century. It shows  Greek Revival style.

Gallery

See also
 River Road Historic Rural District – adjacent historic district on the south, along River Road

References

External links
 

Historic districts on the National Register of Historic Places in New Jersey
National Register of Historic Places in Somerset County, New Jersey
New Jersey Register of Historic Places
Federal architecture in New Jersey
Georgian architecture in New Jersey
Greek Revival architecture in New Jersey
Victorian architecture in New Jersey
Hillsborough Township, New Jersey